Scott David Brosius (born August 15, 1966) is an American former Major League Baseball third baseman for the Oakland Athletics (–) and the New York Yankees (–).

Early life
Brosius grew up in Milwaukie, Oregon, where he attended Rex Putnam High School before going to Linfield College. He was drafted by the Oakland Athletics in the 20th round of the 1987 amateur draft and signed on June 9, 1987.

Career
Brosius became one of the few players to hit a home run in his first major league game, on August 7, 1991. Brosius was the A's starting third baseman through the mid-1990s, although he played almost 300 games in his Oakland career at other positions, primarily in the outfield. In , he batted .304 with 22 home runs, his best year with Oakland; however, his performance declined in 1997 when he finished last in the majors (of those who qualified for the batting title) in batting average, on-base percentage, and slugging average. He was traded to the Yankees after the season for Kenny Rogers, who had struggled mightily in New York.

New York Yankees (1998–2001)
In his first year in the Bronx, he batted .300 with 19 home runs and 98 RBIs. That season, he was selected to his only career All-Star Game. He hit .471 with two homers and six runs batted in the 1998 World Series, and was named the Most Valuable Player. He hit 2 home runs in Game 3 of the World Series, including one off of Padres closer Trevor Hoffman to give the Yankees a 5-3 lead in the 8th helping propel the Yankees to a 3-0 Series lead.

Although his performance over the next three years did not match that of his 1998 season, he remained a perennial fan favorite in the Bronx; his workmanlike blue-collar approach and serviceable durability appealed to fans, teammates, and management alike. On July 18 of that year, against the Montreal Expos, Brosius caught Orlando Cabrera's foul popup for the final out of David Cone's perfect game. He was first among all AL third basemen in errors in 2001, with 22, and had the lowest fielding percentage in the league (.935).

In one of the most dramatic, clutch moments of his career, Brosius hit a two-out, two-run home run in the bottom of the ninth inning of Game 5 of the 2001 World Series against the Arizona Diamondbacks to tie the game and set up an extra-inning Yankees win. The previous night, New York first baseman Tino Martinez had hit a two-out, two-run home run to tie the game in the ninth as well. It marked the first time in World Series history that this had ever occurred. The Yankees would go on to lose Games 6 and 7 of the series, after which Brosius retired.

Coaching career

From 2002 to 2007, Brosius was an assistant coach at Linfield College under head baseball coach Scott Carnahan, Brosius's coach when he played for the school. They switched roles for the 2008 season. Brosius was named head coach and Carnahan, who also is athletic director, became an assistant coach.  Brosius earned his degree from Linfield in 2002.  Brosius has been named Northwest Conference coach of the year five times (2008, 2010, 2011, 2013, 2014) in eight seasons as head coach and led the team into the NCAA Division III national championship tournament four times. The Wildcats finished third in 2010 and in 2013 won Linfield's first NCAA national baseball championship (and second national championship, after the 1971 NAIA victory.) Trying for a rare repeat in 2014, they were eliminated in two straight games. Brosius' win–loss record in eight years as Linfield head coach was 270-96 (.738).

On December 4, 2015, the Seattle Mariners announced that Brosius would be the new hitting coach for their AAA affiliate, the Tacoma Rainiers. He was promoted on October 20, 2016 to assistant coach of Seattle Mariners for the 2017 season. Brosius was named the Mariners third base coach for the 2018 season.

On August 13, 2019, he became the United States national baseball team coach at the 2019 WBSC Premier12. On October 16, 2019, he was promoted to manager when Joe Girardi declined the position. The team finished fourth in the tournament and failed to qualify for the 2020 Olympics in the initial rounds.

Legacy
He was inducted into the Oregon Sports Hall of Fame in 2005.

In 2007 and 2015, Brosius took part in the New York Yankees Old-Timers' Day festivities.

On November 4, 2009, Brosius threw out the first pitch before Game 6 of the 2009 World Series at Yankee Stadium.

References

External links

1966 births
Living people
American expatriate baseball players in Canada
American League All-Stars
Baseball coaches from Oregon
Baseball players from Oregon
Christians from Oregon
Edmonton Trappers players
Gold Glove Award winners
Huntsville Stars players
Linfield Wildcats baseball coaches
Linfield Wildcats baseball players
Madison Muskies players
Major League Baseball third basemen
Medford A's players
Modesto A's players
New York Yankees players
Oakland Athletics players
Seattle Mariners coaches
Sportspeople from Hillsboro, Oregon
Sportspeople from Milwaukie, Oregon
Tacoma Tigers players
Tampa Yankees players
World Series Most Valuable Player Award winners